South Carolina Highway 430 (SC 430) is an  state highway in the west central part of the U.S. state of South Carolina. The highway travels in a south-north orientation from just northeast of Edgefield northwest and then due north to a point on the edge of Sumter National Forest, all within Edgefield County.

Route description
SC 430 begins at an intersection with SC 23 just northeast of Edgefield. This is also the northern terminus of SC 23 Truck, which begins concurrent with SC 430. The two highways head northwest, cutting across the northeast part of the city. They then intersect Meeting Street, which leads to the northbound lanes of U.S. Route 25 Business (US 25 Bus.). At this intersection, SC 23 Truck continues to the northwest, concurrent with the unsigned designation of SC 430 Conn. (which take on the Crest Road name). SC 430 turns right and heads to the north-northeast until it meets its northern terminus, at an intersection with US 378 on the southeastern edge of Sumter National Forest, in a rural part of the county.

SC 430 is not part of the National Highway System, a system of roadways important to the nation's economy, defense, and mobility.

History

Major intersections

Edgefield connector route

South Carolina Highway 430 Connector (SC 430 Conn.) is a  connector route that serves to connect U.S. Route 25 Business (US 25 Bus.) with the SC 430 mainline in the far northern part of Edgefield, which is in the central part of Edgefield County. It is known as Crest Road, is concurrent with SC 23 Truck, and is an unsigned highway.

The connector begins at an intersection with the SC 430 mainline (also known as Crest Road). and Meeting Street, which leads to US 25 Bus. south. Here, SC 23 Truck, which is concurrent with SC 430 southeast of this intersection, leaves the mainline and begins a concurrency with SC 430 Conn. The two highways travel to the northwest and feed into US 25 Bus. north. Here, SC 430 Conn. ends and SC 23 Truck follows US 25 Bus.

See also

References

External links

 
 SC 430 at Virginia Highways' South Carolina Highways Annex

430
Transportation in Edgefield County, South Carolina